Sarfaq is a former settlement in the Upernavik Archipelago region of northwestern Greenland. It was located on Qallunaat Island, an island in Tasiusaq Bay, in the north-central part of the archipelago. The village was perched near the eastern cape of the island, on the shores of Kangerlussuaq Icefjord. The settlement was abandoned in 1919.

References 

Former populated places in Greenland
Tasiusaq Bay
Upernavik Archipelago